Dolian is a village in the Port-à-Piment commune of the Côteaux Arrondissement, in the Sud department of Haiti.

See also
Port-à-Piment

References

Populated places in Sud (department)